Jovica Trajčev (born 9 January 1981) is a Macedonian retired football player, who last played as a central midfielder for Bregalnica Delčevo.

Club career 
In his career he played for Sileks Kratovo, Vardar Skopje and Milano Kumanovo. In May 2005, he signed up with Belgian top-tier side AA Gent. In February 2008, he returned from Belgium to join Bashkimi.

International career
He made his senior debut for Macedonia in a December 2001 friendly match against Oman and has earned a total of 4 caps, scoring no goals. His final international was a January 2002 Bahrain Tournament match against Finland.

References

External links

 Profile on JadranSport.org (English)
 Bio at Gent

1981 births
Living people
People from Radoviš
Association football midfielders
Macedonian footballers
North Macedonia international footballers
FK Sileks players
FK Vardar players
K.A.A. Gent players
K.M.S.K. Deinze players
FK Bashkimi players
FK Milano Kumanovo players
FK Rabotnički players
FK Metalurg Skopje players
FK Bregalnica Štip players
FK Bregalnica Delčevo players
Macedonian First Football League players
Belgian Pro League players
Challenger Pro League players
Macedonian expatriate footballers
Expatriate footballers in Belgium
Macedonian expatriate sportspeople in Belgium